Hunter Harrison (born November 6, 1995) is an American soccer player who currently plays for FC Dallas Dynamo in the UPSL.

Career

College and Amateur 
Harrison spent his freshman year at Oral Roberts University in 2015.

Professional

Tulsa Roughnecks 
Harrison signed with United Soccer League club Tulsa Roughnecks on June 2, 2016.

Meralco Manila 
In May 2017, Harrison signed for Philippines Football League club Meralco Manila.

References

External links 
 

1995 births
Living people
American soccer players
Oral Roberts Golden Eagles men's soccer players
FC Tulsa players
Association football goalkeepers
Soccer players from Texas
USL Championship players
American expatriate sportspeople in the Philippines